This is a list of events that took place in 2008 related to British television.

Events

January

February

March

April

May

June

July

August

September

October

November

December

Debuts

BBC One
1 January – Sense and Sensibility
5 January –
 Basil's Swap Shop
The One and Only
8 January – Mistresses
10 January – Fairy Tales
13 January – Lark Rise to Candleford
4 February – Frankenstein's Cat
7 February – Ashes to Ashes
17 February – The Last Enemy 
10 March – Put Your Money Where Your Mouth Is
15 March – I'd Do Anything
28 March – The Passion
12 April – The Kids Are All Right
28 April – Out of the Blue
1 May – The Invisibles
30 June – Criminal Justice
5 July – Last Choir Standing
8 July – Bonekickers
30 July – Lost Land of the Jaguar
10 August – Britain From Above
26 August – Mutual Friends
11 September – The Planners Are Coming
14 September – Tess of the D'Urbervilles
18 September – The Undercover Soldier
20 September –
Merlin
Hole in the Wall
29 September – Chuggington
7 October Sunshine
12 October – Stephen Fry in America
19 October – Ian Fleming: Where Bond Began
24 October – Little Dorrit
3 November – The Pinky and Perky Show
13 November – Apparitions
23 November – Survivors
30 November – Wallander
25 December – A Matter of Loaf and Death

BBC Two

BBC Three

BBC Four

ITV (1/2/3/4/CITV)

Channel 4

Playhouse Disney UK

Five

E4

Sky1

Watch

Dave

FX

Changes of network affiliation

 It later moved to CITV in early 2009 for brand newer series and then in late 2012 back to Channel 5.

Channels

New channels

Defunct channels

Rebranding channels

Television shows

Returning this year after a break of one year or longer

Continuing television shows

1920s

1930s

1950s

1960s

1970s

1980s

1990s

2000s

Ending this year

Deaths

Top 10 highest viewed programmes

Notes
A Matter of Loaf and Death is the highest viewed non-sporting event since an episode of Coronation Street in 2004 had 16.33 million.
Coronation Streets audience was boosted due to the death of long running and popular character Vera Duckworth.
The results shows of The X Factor and Britain's Got Talent are counted as separate programmes.

See also
 2008 in British music
 2008 in British radio
 2008 in the United Kingdom
 List of British films of 2008

References